Zalesye is a rural locality (a village) in Zhityovskoye Rural Settlement, Syamzhensky District, Vologda Oblast, Russia. The population was 21 as of 2002.

Geography 
Zalesye is located 25 km south of Syamzha (the district's administrative centre) by road. Alexeyevskaya is the nearest rural locality.

References 

Rural localities in Syamzhensky District